Botanical gardens in Iceland have collections consisting entirely of Iceland native and endemic species; most have a collection that include plants from around the world.

 Akureyri Botanical Garden, Akureyri
 Grasagarður Reykjavíkur, Reykjavík

References 

Iceland
Botanical gardens